Mishel Bilibashi (born 8 March 1989 in Tiranë) is an Albanian football player who played in the Albanian Superliga.

References

1989 births
Living people
Footballers from Tirana
Albanian footballers
Association football midfielders
KF Olimpik Tirana players
KF Gramshi players
KS Gramozi Ersekë players
FK Dinamo Tirana players
KF Laçi players
Kjelsås Fotball players
Fostiras F.C. players
Kategoria Superiore players
Albanian expatriate footballers
Expatriate footballers in Norway
Albanian expatriate sportspeople in Norway
Expatriate footballers in Greece
Albanian expatriate sportspeople in Greece